Wargaade Wall is an ancient stone construction in Wargaade, Somalia. It enclosed a large historic settlement in the region.

Overview
Graves and unglazed sherds of pottery dating from antiquity have been found during excavations in the area. The Wall's building material consists of rubble set in mud mortar. The high wall measures . After the settlement was abandoned during the Islamic era, the population of Wargaade began using the wall as a source for building material, which contributed to its current eroded state.

References
Neville Chittick, An Archaeological Reconnaissance of the Horn: The British-Somali Expedition, (1975)

Archaeological sites in Somalia
Walls
Former populated places in Somalia
Ancient Somalia
Archaeological sites of Eastern Africa